The 1984 United States Senate election in Mississippi was held on November 5, 1984. Incumbent Republican U.S. Senator Thad Cochran rode the coattails of President Ronald Reagan, who won 49 states in concurrent presidential election, and won re-election to a second term.

Secretary of State Dick Molpus stated that voter turnout for the Democratic senatorial primary at 8.1% was the lowest in the state's history since 1950.

Major candidates

Democratic
 William F. Winter, former Governor

Republican
 Thad Cochran, incumbent U.S. Senator

Results

See also 
  1984 United States Senate elections

References 

Mississippi
1984
1984 Mississippi elections